Dendrobium utile is a species of orchid native to Sulawesi and Papua, occurring in forests at altitudes of up to 150 m. It is the official flower of Sulawesi Tenggara. Locally this orchid is also called anomi, anemi or alemi, or anggrek serat (fiber orchid) from its fiber-rich root.

Description 
Dendrobium utile is an epiphyte. It is distinguished from similar orchids by the root shaped like a bird nest with green-yellowish colors. The flowers grow in the leaf axils. The petals are yellow, with a narrow shape. The plants make attractive decorations, but are short-lived. The roots are used to make expensive handcrafts because of its soft texture and shiny and golden color.

References

External links 
http://alamendah.wordpress.com/2012/02/20/anggrek-serat-flora-maskot-sulawesi-tenggara/

utile
Epiphytic orchids
Orchids of Indonesia
Orchids of Papua New Guinea
Flora of Sulawesi
Plants described in 1910